Settle College (formerly Settle High School and Settle Girls' High School) is an 11–18 mixed, community secondary school and sixth form in Giggleswick, Settle, North Yorkshire, England. It was established in 1907.

It is a partner in 'The Three Peaks Family of Schools', a grouping of primary, middle and secondary schools in North Craven.

History 
Settle College links back to Settle Girls' High School, founded in 1907, which became the comprehensive Settle High School in 1959. It changed its name to Settle College in 2004 when the school gained Technology College status.

Notable alumni 
 John Newman, musician, singer, songwriter and record producer
 Tom Windle, footballer
 Richard Howson, businessman
 Emma Lonsdale, freestyle skier
 Tyler "Ninja" Blevins, media personality 
 Susan Brookes, chef

Notable staff 
 Anna Adams, art teacher from 1971 to 1974
 Paul Stubbins, maths teacher from 2020 to 2022

References

External links 
 

Community schools in North Yorkshire
Secondary schools in North Yorkshire
Educational institutions established in 1907
1907 establishments in England
Settle, North Yorkshire

Specialist technology colleges in England